The 16th Assembly of Punjab is the legislature of Punjab, Pakistan following the 2013 general election to the Provincial Assembly of the Punjab.

References

2013 Pakistani general election